Marianne is a 1953 Swedish drama film directed by Egil Holmsen and starring Margit Carlqvist, Gunnar Hellström and Eva Stiberg.  It was shot at the Sundbyberg Studios in Stockholm.

The film was shot during May and June 1953 at Europafilm's studio in Sundbyberg, as well as at Enskede Higher General School, the Gazell Club jazz cellar in Old Town, Skeppsbron and Södermalm.  Production manager was Olle Brunæus, scriptwriter Olle Hellbom, photographer Ingvar Borild and editor Wic' Kjellin. The music was composed by Harry Arnold. The film premiered on September 24, 1953 at the Anglais cinema in Stockholm. It is 103 minutes long and suitable for ages 15 and up.

Cast

References

Bibliography 
 Krawc, Alfred. International Directory of Cinematographers, Set- and Costume Designers in Film: Denmark, Finland, Norway, Sweden (from the beginnings to 1984). Saur, 1986.

External links 
 

1953 films
Swedish drama films
1953 drama films
1950s Swedish-language films
Films directed by Egil Holmsen
Swedish black-and-white films
Films set in Stockholm
1950s Swedish films